Olenevo is a rural locality (a village) in Yenangskoye Rural Settlement, Kichmengsko-Gorodetsky District, Vologda Oblast, Russia. The population was 19 as of 2002.

Geography 
Olenevo is located 42 km east of Kichmengsky Gorodok (the district's administrative centre) by road. Shiryayevo is the nearest rural locality.

References 

Rural localities in Kichmengsko-Gorodetsky District